White River station is a sheltered station located in the heart of White River. This station is the western terminus of Via Rail's Sudbury – White River train, and roughly midway between Sudbury and Thunder Bay.

The original station was built by the Canadian Pacific Railway in 1886 and enlarged in 1907.

See also

 List of designated heritage railway stations of Canada

References

External links
Via Rail: White River train station

Via Rail stations in Ontario
Designated heritage railway stations in Ontario
Railway stations in Algoma District
Railway stations in Canada opened in 1886
Canadian Pacific Railway stations in Ontario